The Malabar danio (Devario malabaricus) is a tropical fish belonging to the minnow family (Cyprinidae).  Originating in Sri Lanka and the west coast of India, the fish has been circulated throughout the world through the aquarium fish trade.  It grows to a maximum length of   rarely exceeds  in a home aquarium.

The Malabar danio is found in tropical climates in a wide variety of waters, from mountain streams to small pools, but it prefers flowing waters.  It is an active, schooling fish that prefers to be in groups.  Its diet consists of insects and plant matter.

Malabar danios are oviparous, and spawn in shallow water after heavy rains among the plants growing on the bottom.  An adult will spawn around 200 light-orange, sticky eggs that will hatch in one to two days.  The fry will be free-swimming after the fifth day.  The parents must be removed from aquaria to prevent them from eating the eggs.

The species was earlier incorrectly considered a synonym of Devario aequipinnatus, which is a valid name for a different species.

See also
List of freshwater aquarium fish species

References

External links
Devario malabaricus

Devario
Freshwater fish of Sri Lanka
Fish described in 1849
Taxa named by Thomas C. Jerdon